The 1958–59 season was Blackpool F.C.'s 51st season (48th consecutive) in the Football League. They competed in the 22-team Division One, then the top tier of English football, finishing eighth.

This was Ron Suart's first season as manager, after his succession of the long-serving Joe Smith.

Ray Charnley was the club's top scorer, with 26 goals (20 in the league and six in the FA Cup).

Table

Notes

References

Blackpool F.C.
Blackpool F.C. seasons